Kern Power Plant was a former power station located in Bakersfield, California, that was operational until 1986. During its implosion in August 2013, shrapnel injured five bystanders, including one man whose leg was severed.

References

Oil-fired power stations in California
Buildings and structures in Bakersfield, California
Former oil-fired power stations in the United States
Buildings and structures demolished in 2013
Demolished buildings and structures in California
Former power stations in California